Benjamin Chenery (born 28 January 1977) is an English footballer who played in The Football League for Cambridge United and Luton Town.

After a spell at Kettering Town he joined Canvey Island and played for them for five years. While at the club he scored the winning goal in the FA Trophy final in 2001 against Forest Green Rovers.

After retiring from the game in 2007 Ben quickly rose through the coaching ranks and after a brief spell as assistant manager at Conference South side Chelmsford City FC joined semi-professional Isthmian League side Bury Town FC in July 2012 as assistant to Richard Wilkins. He took over as Manager of Bury Town in July 2014.

Honours

As a player
Canvey Island
 FA Trophy Winner (1): 2000-01
 Isthmian League Premier Division Winner (1): 2003-04
 Isthmian League Premier Division Runner-Up (3): 2000-01, 2001-02, 2002-03
 Essex Senior Cup Winner (1): 2001–02
 Essex Senior Cup Runner-Up (1): 2000–01

References

English footballers
Ipswich Town F.C. players
Luton Town F.C. players
Cambridge United F.C. players
Kettering Town F.C. players
Canvey Island F.C. players
Chelmsford City F.C. players
English Football League players
1977 births
Living people
English football managers
Isthmian League managers
Bury Town F.C. managers
Association football defenders
Chelmsford City F.C. non-playing staff